CarSwap is a car sales and exchange mobile app and website platform.

History
CarSwap is an app founded in 2016 by Lane Kwllis, and incorporated in 2017.

App
The CarSwap app matches car owners in order for them to exchange their motor vehicles with each other. It also allows cars to be bought and sold through the app. Low offers are responded to by a program that tries to influence the sale price of the car. Exchanges can be either temporary or permanent, and are aided by a matchmaking function in the app. In the function, users are shown ads for cars that approximate what they are looking for one at a time, and they can either learn more about the ad or discard the options as they progress. Users are charged per qualifying offer they receive on their listed vehicle, with the number of charges is capped per month.

Users
The app began in Australia, and has since been usable in the US and other countries. CarSwap engages with both individuals and car dealerships.

References

External links
 

Australian companies established in 2016
Internet properties established in 2016
Mobile applications
Technology companies of Australia